Gurjit Singh is a Fijian professional football manager.

Career
In the 1990s he trained Tailevu/Naitasiri F.C. with the club winning title of best coach of the year in 1994. Until 2009 he worked as manager for the Navua F.C. He coaching Lautoka F.C. for the 2009–10 OFC Champions League. In January 2011 Gurjit Singh is a new coach of Fiji national football team. Later he works as manager of the Suva F.C.

Honour
League Championship (for Districts): 1
2014

 Inter-District Championship : 3
2009, 2012, 2014

 Fiji Football Association Cup Tournament: 2
2009, 2012

Coach of the Year Award: 3
1994, 2012, 2014

References

External links
Profile at Soccerway.com
Profile at Soccerpunter.com

Year of birth missing (living people)
Living people
Fijian football managers
Fiji national football team managers
Place of birth missing (living people)
Fijian people of Indian descent